Lars Rune Söderdahl (born 26 July 1964 in Tyresö, Sweden) is a Swedish former actor, best known for his roles as Skorpan in The Brothers Lionheart and as Lillebror in Karlsson-on-the-Roof, both works are written by Astrid Lindgren. He retired from acting in 1990 and is since then a missionary in South America. He has worked at Livets Ord. Now he lives in Malmö and worked at Posten AB in 2005.

Selected filmography
1977 - Himmel och pannkaka (TV)
1977 - The Brothers Lionheart
1974 - Karlsson-on-the-Roof

Bibliography
 Holmstrom, John. The Moving Picture Boy: An International Encyclopaedia from 1895 to 1995. Norwich, Michael Russell, 1996, p. 367.

References
 
Svensk Filmdatabas
Info about Söderdahl and other Astrid Lindgren-actors

Living people
Swedish male actors
1964 births
Swedish Protestant missionaries